Calon may refer to:

 Château Calon-Ségur Bordeaux wine producer archaically named simply Calon
 Calon Lân, Welsh hymn

Media
 Calon (TV production company) A Welsh animation company formally Siriol Productions Ltd. 
 Calon FM, British community radio station

People:
 Christian Calon (b. 1950), Canadian composer

In fiction:
 Calon Arang, mythological character from Javanese and Balinese folklore

See also

Caloy